Dead Cities is a 1996 album by electronic music group The Future Sound of London.

Overview
The album art consisted of 3D graphics, photography, and writing complementing the album's themes, combined via digital image editing. This was created primarily by the band and then-frequent artistic collaborator Buggy G. Riphead. A limited edition release of the album included a 196-page book, containing additional artwork and writing in the same style.

"My Kingdom" and "We Have Explosive" were released as singles. The "My Kingdom" music video was directed by the same artistic collaboration, whereas the "We Have Explosive" music video was directed by 2D-animator Run Wrake.

Track listing
Though the album contains 13 tracks, the track listing on the back insert of the CD is ambiguous, as 15 song titles are listed, with most of the second half of songs not numbered. The common interpretation, confirmed by the promo edition of the CD, is listed here:

"Herd Killing" – 2:37
"Dead Cities" – 6:37
"Her Face Forms in Summertime" – 5:38
"We Have Explosive" – 6:19
"Everyone in the World Is Doing Something Without Me" – 4:10
"My Kingdom" – 5:47
"Max" – 2:48
"Antique Toy" – 5:43
 – 6:57
 "Quagmire" – 5:13
 "In a State of Permanent Abyss" – 1:44
"Glass" – 5:38
"Yage" – 7:32
 – 5:32
 "Vit Drowning" – 4:48
 "Through Your Gills I Breathe" – 0:44
 – 4:46
 "First Death in the Family" – 2:18
 silence – 1:00
 "Dead Cities Reprise" (hidden track by Headstone Lane) – 1:28

Samples and other information
 "Herd Killing" is the shorter edit of a remix of track 4; the full version is called "We Have Explosive (Herd Killing Mix)" on a single. Both feature several samples from the Run-DMC album Tougher Than Leather.
 "Dead Cities", contains a vocal sample of Laurence Fishburne from the film Deep Cover.
 "We Have Explosive" was used in the second game in the "wipE'out"" series, wipE'out" 2097, for the original PlayStation. The song was also used in the film Mortal Kombat: Annihilation.
 The vocals on "Everyone in the World Is Doing Something Without Me" were performed by Canadian opera singer Rebecca Caine.
 "My Kingdom" prominently features:
 A vocal sample of "Rachael's Song" (aka "Rachel's Song") by Vangelis, from the Blade Runner soundtrack (1982).
 A sample of the intro to "Cockeye's Song", and rearranged samples of Gheorghe Zamfir's pan flute riff in "Cockeye's Song" and "Childhood Memories", taken from Ennio Morricone's soundtrack for Once Upon a Time in America (1984).
 A guitar sample taken from Ozric Tentacles's album Pungent Effulgent (1989).
 The title of track 11, "Yage", was a previous alias of FSOL, and still their alias for their own sound engineering credits.
 The title of track 12, "Vit Drowning", refers to Vit, a Chinese restaurant owner friend with the artists. His face appears on the "Far-out Son of Lung" cover, and he appears in the "Teachings From The Electronic Brain II" and "My Kingdom" videos"
 Whether it was coincidental or otherwise, the album's final track, "Dead Cities Reprise" (hidden track by Headstone Lane), is of a very similar nature to the predominant sound and style that FSOL adopted for their following album, The Isness, released under their alias Amorphous Androgynous (except in the US, where it was released as FSOL for commercial reasons).

Charts
Album – UK Albums Chart

Singles – UK Singles Chart

References

External links
 Complete track listing of Dead Cities (from the limited edition) at Discogs
 An alleged 1996 answer from FSOL about the track listing

1996 albums
Astralwerks albums
The Future Sound of London albums
Virgin Records albums